The 1984 Eastern Illinois Panthers football team represented Eastern Illinois University as a member of the Association of Mid-Continent Universities during the 1984 NCAA Division I-AA football season.

Schedule

References

Eastern Illinois
Eastern Illinois Panthers football seasons
Eastern Illinois Panthers football
Association of Mid-Continent Universities football champion seasons